The Headhunter Demos is an extended play record by The Clay People, released in 2000 by Overit Records.

Track listing

Personnel
Adapted from The Headhunter Demos liner notes.

Clay People
 Dan Dinsmore – drums
 Mike Guzzardi – guitar
 Brian McGarvey – bass guitar
 Daniel Neet – lead vocals

Additional performers
 Wade Alin – programming

Production and design
 Paul Benedetti – mixing (1-3)
 Neil Kernon – production (4, 5) and mixing (4, 5)

Release history

References

External links 
 The Headhunter Demos at Bandcamp
 The Headhunter Demos at Discogs (list of releases)

2000 EPs
The Clay People albums